Charleston Municipal Auditorium is a public auditorium in Charleston, West Virginia, as part of the Charleston Coliseum & Convention Center.

It was constructed in 1939 and is a large monolithic concrete and steel structure, situated in the southwestern section of Charleston's central business district.

It is an example of the Art Deco architectural style in a public building and was listed on the National Register of Historic Places in 1999.

With a capacity of 3,483 (2,377 on the orchestra level and 1,106 on the balcony), the Municipal Auditorium is the largest theater in West Virginia. Concerts, graduations, Broadway stage shows and other special events, including the annual presentation of The Nutcracker,  are held on the auditorium's 65-by-85.5-foot stage.

Country music singer Hank Williams (1923-1953) was scheduled to perform a New Year's Eve show at the auditorium on December 31, 1952. Due to bad weather in Nashville, he was not able to fly to the venue. While en route to the New Year's Day show in Canton, Ohio, Williams died of heart failure in the back seat of his Cadillac near Oak Hill, West Virginia.

References

External links

Art Deco architecture in West Virginia
Theatres completed in 1939
Buildings and structures in Charleston, West Virginia
National Register of Historic Places in Charleston, West Virginia
Performing arts centers in West Virginia
Theatres on the National Register of Historic Places in West Virginia
Concert halls in the United States